Mark Harvey Fleischman (February 1, 1940 – July 13, 2022) was an American businessman. He is best known for being the onetime owner of Studio 54.

Career
In 1981, Fleischman bought Studio 54 from its original owners Steve Rubell and Ian Schrager. Later he opened and owned the nightclub Tatou. He also opened the short-lived nightclub Gaugin at the Plaza Hotel when it was owned by future U.S. President Donald Trump.

In 2017, Fleischman published his memoir about the famed disco he once owned, titled Inside Studio 54.

Death
In June 2022 he announced he had decided to die by assisted suicide in Switzerland, after living since 2016 with an undiagnosed medical condition that affected his ability to speak and left him in a wheelchair.  

Fleischman ended his life on July 13, 2022, with the aid of the assisted dying non-profit Dignitas. He was 82 years old.

References

External links

1940 births
2022 deaths
2022 suicides
20th-century American businesspeople
21st-century American memoirists
Businesspeople from New York City
Deaths by euthanasia
Nightclub owners
Studio 54
Suicides in Switzerland